Labdia ioxantha is a moth in the family Cosmopterigidae. It was described by Edward Meyrick in 1915. It is known from Sri Lanka.

References

Labdia
Moths described in 1915